Duncan is a thoroughbred racehorse. He won the Irish St. Leger at the Curragh Racecourse in a dead heat with Jukebox Jury.

References

Racehorses bred in the United Kingdom
Racehorses trained in the United Kingdom
2005 racehorse births
Irish Classic Race winners
Thoroughbred family 1-n